Georges Van Haelen (born 9 August 1899, date of death unknown) was a Belgian boxer who competed in the 1924 Summer Olympics. In 1924 he was eliminated in the second round of the middleweight class after losing to Daniel Daney.

References

External links
 

1899 births
Year of death missing
Middleweight boxers
Olympic boxers of Belgium
Boxers at the 1924 Summer Olympics
Belgian male boxers